The Russian Chamber Music Foundation of Seattle (RCMFS) was founded in 2007 and has brought well known performers and groups to the Seattle music scene, including the Chamber Music Society of Lincoln Center, Erin Keefe, Arnaud Sussmann,  Joshua Roman and Amos Yang.  The organization specializes in the promotion of Russian music including solo and chamber music genres performed at Benaroya Hall in downtown Seattle. The artistic director, Natalya Ageyeva, studied at the Moscow Conservatory and University of Washington and has performed throughout the United States, Russia, and Europe.

References

External links

2007 establishments in Washington (state)
Chamber music groups
Non-profit organizations based in Seattle
Musical groups from Seattle
Organizations established in 2007